Luís Remo de Maria Bernardo Fernandes (born 8 May 1953) is a singer and musician from India with naturalized Portuguese citizenship. Known as a pioneer of Indian pop music, he performs pop/rock/Indian fusion and is also a film playback singer. His musical work is a fusion of many different cultures and styles that he has been exposed to as a child in Goa and in his later travels around the world. Such influences include Goan and Portuguese music, Sega music (from Mauritius and Seychelles), African music, Latin music (from Spain and South America), the music of erstwhile European communist states, those of the dance halls from Jamaica and Soca (from Trinidad and Tobago).

Writing and singing songs in English made his success more rare and distinctive in the context of the Bollywood-dominated, Hindi language-based, occasionally even disco music scene that was popular in the 1980s and 1990s. His compositions in English, reflecting life and socio-political happenings in India with which every Indian could identify. His Hindi pop/rock and film songs became instant hits with the Indian masses, earning him Gold, Platinum and Double Platinum Discs. A popular stage performer in India, he has also taken part in many music festivals around the world. He has performed with members of international groups such as Jethro Tull, Led Zeppelin and Queen.

He now writes and sings his songs in five different languages: English, Hindi, French, Portuguese and Konkani.

Life and career

1953–1977: Early life and musical influences
Remo Fernandes was born to the well-known Panjim family of Bernado and Luiza Fernandes on 8 May 1953. He has a sister named Belinda, who sings Brazilian songs. Although brought up in a Catholic family, Remo says he "realized that god is beyond religion". Remo's first introduction to rock music was at the age of seven, when a cousin returned from London with "Rock Around The Clock", a record by Bill Haley & His Comets. He spent the next decade listening to music of that era's most popular icons:

In school, Remo developed his guitar playing skills along with a group of friends (Alexandre Rosario, Tony Godinho, and Caetano Abreu) and formed a school band with them, named 'The Beat 4'. He wrote his first songs around age 14. He won prizes best composer, best vocalist, and best lead guitarist in all-Goa competitions.

After graduating from school, Remo went on to earn a bachelor's degree in Architecture from Sir J.J College of Architecture in the city of Mumbai, greatly influenced by Lucio Miranda (Mario Miranda's cousin, who is an architect and musician). His love for music continued, and he often bunked classes to work on his technique. He continued writing his own songs, playing solo or playing with different bands, including one of Bombay's top bands, The Savages, with whom he released an album, Ode to the Messiah, on Polydor Records in 1975. Mumbai being one of the few cities in India at the time with a niche audience for rock music, Remo played in concerts and venues such as Shanmukhnanda Hall, Rang Bhavan, and in all the major college campuses of the city. Remo brought an Indian element to his music with his sitar/guitar, and taught himself to play the Indian flute.

1977-1985: Career beginnings
After graduating, Remo traveled in Europe and North Africa between 1977 and 1980, performing with fusion rock bands and even releasing an album, Rock Synergie, in Paris in 1979. He then returned to Goa and immersed himself in its hippie culture. He met a group of travelling European artists who named themselves the Amsterdam Balloon Company, and began playing at their concerts at Baga. He even invited them to perform at Miramar Beach. Later, Remo performed in Amsterdam with Lucas Amor, the violinist in this group, and release a record called Venus and the Moon in 1981. He also formed his own band of fusion music called Indiana with bass guitarist Abel, tabla player Lala and the percussionist Bondo.

Remo recorded his maiden album Goan Crazy (in 1984) and a subsequent album Old Goan Gold (in 1985) on a four-track cassette TEAC Portastudio recorder in his home under the banner of 'Goana Records'. In these albums he played all the instruments, sang all voices, and was the only composer of its music and lyrics. He engineered the recording and mixing and designed the album covers. He had cassettes produced in Mumbai and personally went about distributing the cassettes from shop to shop in Goa with an illustrated book of poems he wrote (called Leads), and postcards and T-shirts he designed.

1986–1994: Pack That Smack, concerts, Jalwa, subsequent successes and marriage
After releasing his first hit album Pack That Smack in 1986 and Bombay City the next year, he became the highest-selling English rock musician in India and the only one in the country to be awarded Gold Discs for this category. Pack That Smack was his first album to be released by a national record company, CBS. This was an anti-drugs themed album, especially against addiction to heroin, which contained songs such as "Just a Hippie" and "Down with Brown", as well as asocio-political satire titled "Mr Minister", a nursery rhyme-styled song on politician who went to sleep once elected to power; and "So Wie Du", a recording of an award-winning live performance of his from the Dresden Song Competition. Bombay City contained hits such as "Against you/Against me", "Ocean Queen" and a hilarious take on the condition of telephone services in India, "Ode to Graham Bell".

Later in 1986, he was invited to play at an official government function in Goa for the Indian Prime Minister Rajiv Gandhi, who was visiting. There he sang a song titled "Hello Rajiv Gandhi", which spoke about the hurried completion of Kala Academy just before Prime Minister Gandhi's arrival, and requested Gandhi to visit Goa repeatedly to increase the speed of other construction work. The song caused an uproar in the local press and subsequently in the national press. Remo mailed these critical press clippings to the Prime Minister, who immediately replied saying that he and his wife Sonia had loved the song and had found nothing objectionable in it. This letter, together with the whole story in pictures, was published in many publications in the country.

Later the same year, Remo sang in Bombay at a concert called Aid Bhopal, aimed at raising funds for victims of the Bhopal gas tragedy, in which he sang two of his songs, "Pack that Smack" and "Ode to Graham Bell". To his surprise, both his songs were televised by Doordarshan, the government-controlled TV channel in India, on four successive Sundays at prime time. 

He composed and performed music for Trikal by Shyam Benegal. In April 1986, he composed and performed the title song for the movie Jalwa, which was released in 1987. This 15-minute song made him instantly famous due to the popularity of Bollywood cinema and of the Hindi language.

He played music on the streets during the Konkani language agitation of 1986, spreading a message of peace to the violent protestors.

When invited to attend international music festivals and concerts, Remo again started travelling around the world. His first international event was at the 1986 Dresden International Song Competition in former East Germany. There he won three awards, the Press Critics Award, the Audience Favorite Award, and the overall Second Prize. He once represented India, when it was invited, in the Tokyo Music Festival. He also took part in the MIDEM '96 Music Festival in Hong Kong, Festival of India in the USSR, besides Festivals in Macau, Germany, Seychelles, Bulgaria and Mauritius.

During a 1987 trip to Kolkata, Remo visited Mother Teresa as he was stuck for a day in the city. She managed to influence him deeply and he wrote the songs "Take Me to Calcutta" and "Welcome My Child" on the flight back home. He had initially planned to release an album dedicated to her in 1990, with the tentative title of That Lady in Calcutta. However, these plans never came to fruition till 2019.

Around this time Remo married Frenchwoman Michele Delahaye, with whom he has two sons, Noah and Jonah. He has an ancestral home in the village of Siolim, in Bardez taluka of Goa, where they all lived. Remo and Michele later separated.

The next album he released in 1992 with Magnasound was titled Politicians Don't Know to Rock'n'Roll. Released in the backdrop of communal violence spreading in India, events such as the assassination of Rajiv Gandhi and the destruction of the Babri Masjid mosque in Ayodhya, the album expressed the political tension of the time. It included songs such as "Don't kick up the Rao", about the then Prime Minister P. V. Narasimha Rao, along with a song for India, "How does it feel?" and a song about safe sex titled "Everybody wants to".

1995–2000: Playback singing, advertisements and collaborations
In 1995, Remo finally moved into Hindi pop and film music to become a playback singer, by teaming up with the director Mani Ratnam and composer A. R. Rahman. He sang the song "Humma Humma" in the Hindi dubbed of Tamil film Bombay. The song went on to earn Remo a Double Platinum. "Huiya Ho" was the next hit he composed for the film Khamoshi: The Musical which was released in 1996.

In 1995, during the Channel V Music Awards, Remo, on a bass guitar, and Queen's Roger Taylor on drums, played with Led Zeppelin band members, Jimmy Page and Robert Plant.

When Pepsi entered Indian markets in the 1990s as Leher Pepsi, they signed Remo for an endorsement deal and got him to star in their first two launch ad films. He also advertised for Raymonds.

In February 2005, Remo collaborated with Jethro Tull along with renowned Indian percussionist Sivamani for a concert held in Dubai. They performed tracks such as "Mother Goose", "Locomotive Breath", and Remo's now very famous Flute Kick also informally called "the flute song". Jethro Tull also backed Remo as he sang his own "Bombay City" and "Maria Pita Che".

Remo has long participated in and promoted a local festival called the Siolim Zagor.

2001–2009: Microwave Papadums accident, its impact, reunion concert and subsequent projects
In 2001, three Microwave Papadums band members, Dharamedra Hirve, Selwyn Pereira and Victor Alvares, along with Remo's personal assistant Sunil Redkar, were killed in a road accident in Kanpur after a concert there. Remo was devastated and stayed away from music and performances for a year.

In 2002, Remo released two albums, Symphonic Chants and India Beyond. Tracks from India Beyond were signed to and released by Buddha Bar, Paris, France, and Opium Garden, Miami, USA. In India these albums went unnoticed.

In 2003, on his 50th birthday, Remo held a reunion concert in Goa with many of his former bands; The Beat 4, Indiana, and The Savages, besides friends like The Valadares Sisters and Lucio Miranda. It was a 4-hour concert attended by 25,000 people.

In 2007, Remo released the album Muchacha Latina. For the title song he scripted, directed and edited the music video himself.

In January the same year, he was conferred the Padma Shri by the Indian government. He refused an award conferred by the Goa government's Department of Art and Culture later that year. He was then awarded the Karamveer Puraskar by a group of Delhi-based NGOs later that year for the social messages and the impact of his works.

2010–2014: Music close to his heart and political career
From then on, Remo made songs which were closest to his heart right from the start: socio-political comments and critiques, exposing corruption, communalism and other evils in India, and motivating people against them. He distributed these songs on the Internet for free, together with their music videos. Once again, they were scripted, directed and edited by him. The most memorable of these are "India, I Cry" (2009), "India Against Corruption" (in support of the 2011 Anna Hazare movement of the same name), and "Vote: Tit for Tat".

In 2011, Remo was approached by the Election Commission of India to be their 'Youth Icon for Ethical Voting' in Goa. "Vote: Tit for Tat" was composed to encourage the Goans to vote out corrupt ministers. Later that year, Remo sang a song for a new film, David, by Bejoy Nambiar (maker of the 2010 film Shaitan). This marked his return to Bollywood playback singing.

Remo was later seen working on three personal albums, one of them being a re-recording of his very first Goan Crazy!, in 2013. 
He later gave his tunes and voice to the title track of Luv U Soniyo which released on 26 July 2013.

In December 2013, he signed up as a member of Aam Aadmi Party, a political party, for Goa constituency. He wrote a jingle for their campaign for the 2014 Indian general election, but announced that he had left politics by March 2014.

2015–Present: Acting debut, son's incident, move to Portugal and subsequent projects
Remo appeared in the 2015 Anurag Kashyap film Bombay Velvet as a Portuguese nobleman, marking his debut in acting. While he had previously appeared in films (singing his own songs), this was his first speaking role.

In 2015, he was involved in a case of the alleged verbal abuse of a young girl recovering in Goa Medical College after she was allegedly hit by a car driven by his son, Jonah. The girl was walking towards Old Goa to complete her vow to St Francis Xavier when the accident occurred. In 2018, the Goa Children's Court acquitted him after finding that there was "no consistency between the testimonies" of lawyer Aires Rodrigues and the alleged victim. The resulting investigation, however, revealed that Remo had long since been a Portuguese citizen, possibly even when he was awarded the Padma Shri.

By 2016, Remo had resettled to Portugal. In  2019, he began working on his memoirs and on a concept album, Teresa and the Slum Bum, reminiscing his time spent with Mother Teresa in 1987. An opera featuring 26 songs and two instrumental pieces, it presents pro bono works by 35 singers from Europe, USA and India. Remo has played all instruments himself. Fleur Anne Dias is one singer who will be crooning in a song dedicated to Mother Teresa. Remo plans to crowdfund to cover the expenses of producing the album. The album was initially slated for a 2020 release with the tentative title of That Lady in Calcutta.

Discography

Studio albums

 Ode to the Messiah (with The Savages, 1975)
 Rock Synergie (Paris, 1980)
 Venus and the Moon (Netherlands, 1981)
 Goan Crazy! (1984)
 Old Goan Gold (1985)
 Pack That Smack (1986)
 Bombay City (1987)
 Politicians Don't Know to Rock'n'Roll (1992)
 O, Meri Munni (with his band Microwave Papadums, 1998)
 Symphonic Chants (2002)
 India Beyond (2002)
 Muchacha Latina (2007)
 Teresa and the Slum Bum (2019)

Singles

 "Flute Kick (The Flute Song)"
 "Hello Rajiv Gandhi"
 "Ode to Graham Bell"
 "Take Me to Calcutta"
 "Welcome My Child"
 "Bombay City"
 "Maria Pita Che"
 "India, I Cry"
 "Cyber Viber"
 "India Against Corruption"
 "Vote: Tit for Tat"

Soundtracks

Filmography

Awards
 Press Critics Award, Audience Favorite Award, and overall Second Prize at Dresden International Song Competition. (1986)
 Padma Shri by Indian Government. (2007)
 Karmaveer Puraskaar by Delhi-based NGOs. (2007)

References

External links

 
 

1953 births
Living people
Singers from Goa
People from Panaji
Konkani-language singers
Indian male playback singers
Indian male pop singers
Indian pop composers
Indian rock musicians
Recipients of the Padma Shri in arts
Male actors in Telugu cinema
Male actors in Hindi cinema